is a railway station in the city of Toyama, Toyama Prefecture, Japan, operated by the private railway operator Toyama Chihō Railway.

Lines

Station layout 
The station has one ground-level island platform serving two tracks. The station is staffed.

History

It was renamed to its present name on 1 July 1970.

Adjacent stations

Passenger statistics
In fiscal 2015, the station was used by 84 passengers daily.

Surrounding area 
Omi Elementary School
Omi Post Office

See also
 List of railway stations in Japan

References

External links

 

Railway stations in Toyama Prefecture
Railway stations in Japan opened in 1931
Stations of Toyama Chihō Railway